Świny may refer to the following places in Poland:
Świny, Lower Silesian Voivodeship (south-west Poland)
Świny, Łódź Voivodeship (central Poland)